Karl Pilkington (born 23 September 1972) is an English presenter, comedian, actor, voice-artist, producer and author.

After working with Ricky Gervais and Stephen Merchant as producer on their XFM radio show, Pilkington became a co-host of The Ricky Gervais Show. He presented the Sky travel comedy series An Idiot Abroad and the Sky 1 travel comedy series The Moaning of Life. He made his acting debut in Gervais' comedy-drama series Derek and co-founded the television production company RiSK Productions alongside Gervais and Merchant. He also co-created, co-wrote, and starred in the comedy series Sick of It.

Early life
Pilkington was born on 23 September 1972 in Sale, Greater Manchester. He grew up in the Racecourse Estate neighbourhood of Sale, and has an older sister and older brother. He has discussed having a close relationship with his parents, and has shared stories about his mother and father holding multiple jobs. However, he was never close to his siblings, which he attributed to being 10 years younger than them; he once said that it had been "years" since he had last talked to them. He attended Ashton-on-Mersey School in Sale. He said that he never liked school and struggled with the system, at some point losing all interest in it. He has claimed that he attended school only to sell items to his schoolmates, usually video games that he had purchased and made copies of. He said, "I wasn't going to school to learn, I was going to earn." At the age of 15, he dropped out of school to work as a cassette and disk printer through a Youth Training Scheme program.

Career

Early work
Pilkington moved to London to work as a producer at XFM, where he was later promoted to head of production. While there, he unintentionally caused Gail Porter to leave the station in tears after only one show; he criticised her performance, which Pilkington defended as an attempt to encourage improvement. After several years, he began work on The Ricky Gervais Show. Initially, Pilkington was solely the programme's producer and rarely spoke on-air, but as Gervais and Merchant began to frequently invite him to make cameo appearances, Pilkington's eccentric personality came to prominence and his popularity increased. He was eventually included as a main presenter on the broadcasts, with large amounts of airtime devoted to his controversial opinions on various subjects, often due to his misunderstanding of the stories. He created many features for the broadcasts, including Monkey News, Rockbusters, Educating Ricky and many others. Rockbusters, in particular, garnered the most attention, with regular emails being sent to the station from listeners in the hopes to win prizes. These prizes were often mundane and low quality and were often referred to as things Pilkington "picked up from around the office".  In December 2005, Pilkington stood in for two BBC Radio 6 Music shows for Nemone, co-presenting with Russell Brand.

Celebrity
Pilkington's presence on The Ricky Gervais Show podcasts significantly increased his fame. He has often been mentioned in interviews given by Gervais and is often the victim of Gervais' pranks and insults directed towards the spherical appearance of his bald head. After Pilkington said "I could eat a knob at night" on the podcast (in relation to I'm a Celebrity contestants eating a kangaroo penis), Gervais encouraged his listeners to sample the sound bite and mix it into dance music. The phrase spawned several dance music mixes, T-shirts and other merchandise. Many of Pilkington's quotes have since gained publicity, particularly on the Internet. Reuters described Pilkington as a "phenomenon" who had made "Internet history."

On 23 November 2010, while appearing live on Richard Bacon's Radio 5 Live afternoon show, Gervais surprised Pilkington with an on-air phone call. This led to a conversation in which Pilkington, who claimed to have been interrupted while grouting his kitchen, claimed that he had not yet been paid for his work on An Idiot Abroad and concluded the interview with an improvised link into the hourly news. 

Pilkington has worked independently of Gervais and Merchant on several projects. He appeared as a guest on the shows Flipside TV and The Culture Show, and appeared in several short films as part of the Channel 4 project 3 Minute Wonders.

Merchant and Gervais have repeatedly denied claims that Pilkington's persona is their creation. In an on-air response to similar claims made by Chris Campling during a broadcast on Xfm, Merchant stated that he would be "ashamed" if the radio show had been scripted, adding that "I would not have squandered a character that good on this poxy radio station." Gervais concurred, pointing out that writing a single series' worth of six half-hour episodes of shows such as The Office and Extras consumed as long as a full year of their time. An interviewer for The Daily Telegraph concluded that Pilkington's behaviour is genuine.

Television and DVD
Pilkington appeared in an interview titled  Meet Karl Pilkington on Gervais's live standup comedy DVD Politics. The DVD of Gervais's film The Invention of Lying contains a special feature also called Meet Karl Pilkington that documents his participation in the film as a non-speaking caveman in another special feature, The Dawn of Lying. He was given a small role in the final episode of Extras.

In September 2010, Pilkington starred in An Idiot Abroad, a light-hearted Sky1 travel documentary series produced by Gervais and Merchant in which he visits the New 7 Wonders of the World while participating in various activities along the way. He wrote a book to accompany the series.

The second series, subtitled The Bucket List, debuted on 23 September 2011 on Sky 1 and features Pilkington partaking in ultimate experiences from a list selected for him. In June 2011, he won the Best Presenter award for An Idiot Abroad at the Factual Entertainment Awards. The third series of the show, An Idiot Abroad: The Short Way Round, premiered in November 2012 and showed Pilkington and Warwick Davis travelling the Marco Polo route.

He made his acting debut on 12 April 2012 in the Channel 4 comedy-drama Derek, portraying caretaker and bus driver Dougie. He left the show after the first episode of the second series. From 2013 to 2015, Pilkington starred in a two-series Sky 1 documentary called The Moaning of Life. From 2018 to 2020, he co-wrote and starred in a Sky 1 scripted sitcom called Sick of It. In 2022, Pilkington starred in the ITV drama The Thief, His Wife and the Canoe as DC Phil Bayley. Pilkington has also performed voice-over work for such clients as Sky TV, One Stop Office Shop, FreeView, Vodafone, HMV, Sony PSP, WHSmith, Wickes, Unilever and SMARTY.

Charity work
In 2014, Pilkington designed and signed his own card for the Thomas Coram Foundation for Children charity. The campaign was launched by crafting company Stampin' Up! UK; his card, along with those designed and signed by other celebrities, was auctioned on eBay in May 2014.

Personal life
Pilkington resides in Sandbanks, Dorset. He is in a long-term cohabiting relationship with his partner, Suzanne, whom he frequently mentions in his work.

Pilkington supported Manchester City as a child, but has supported Manchester United since the 1990s. In January 2020, he revealed on Sunday Brunch that he had been attempting to eat fewer animal products and described himself as a flexitarian.

Filmography

Film

Television

Radio

Bibliography

References

External links

 
 Karl Pilkington's Profile on Xfm.co.uk (Archived from the original on 5 August 2012)

1972 births
Living people
People from Sale, Greater Manchester
English podcasters
English radio DJs
English radio presenters
English radio producers
English male film actors
English male television actors
20th-century English comedians
21st-century English comedians
20th-century English male actors
21st-century English male actors